Edward Robinson or Eddie Robinson may refer to:

Politicians
Edward Robinson (Maine politician) (1796–1857), U.S. Representative from Maine
Edward Robinson (Canadian politician) (1829–1888), Ontario lawyer and political figure
Edward Robinson (Australian politician) (1839–1913), Member of the Western Australian Legislative Council

Sports

American football
Edward N. Robinson (1873–1945), American college football coach at University of Nebraska–Lincoln, Brown University, and University of Maine
Eddie Robinson (American football coach) (1919–2007), American college football coach at Grambling State University
Eddie Robinson (linebacker) (born 1970), American football linebacker and coach at Alabama State University
Ed Robinson (American football) (born 1970), American football linebacker

Other sports
Edward Robinson (cricketer) (1862–1942), English amateur first-class cricketer
Eddie Robinson (soccer) (born 1978), retired American soccer player
Eddie Robinson (baseball) (1920–2021), American Major League Baseball first baseman, scout, coach and front office executive
Eddie Robinson (rugby union) (1927–1983), New Zealand rugby union player
Eddie Robinson (basketball) (born 1976), American professional basketball player

Others

Edward Robinson (?-1816), London silversmith
Edward Robinson (scholar) (1794–1863), American biblical scholar and archaeologist
Edward Robinson (curator) (1858–1931), American writer and authority on art
Edward Robinson (VC) (1838–1896), English recipient of the Victoria Cross
Edward G. Robinson (1893–1973), Romanian-born American actor
Edward Ray Robinson (1893–1979), American set decorator
Edward G. Robinson Jr. (1933–1974), American actor and son of Edward G. Robinson

See also
Ted Robinson (disambiguation)
Ed Robinson (Edwin Robinson, born 1971), reporter and producer on Sky Sports
Edwin Arlington Robinson (1869–1935), American poet